The following shows the public housing estates in Ngau Chi Wan, Wong Tai Sin District, Kowloon, Hong Kong.

Overview

Choi Hung Estate

Choi Wan Estate, Choi Fai Estate, Choi Fung Court

Fu Shan Estate 

Fu Shan Estate is located in Diamond Hill, between Hammer Hill and Tsz Wan Shan and near Diamond Hill Crematorium. It consists of three Old Slab blocks and one non-standard block built in 1978 and 2020, respectively.

Fu Shan Estate is in Primary One Admission (POA) School Net 45. Within the school net are multiple aided schools (operated independently but funded with government money); no government primary schools are in this net.

Grand View Garden 

Grand View Garden is a Private Sector Participation Scheme court in Diamond Hill, near Fu Shan Estate. It was jointly developed by the Hong Kong Housing Authority and Chun Wo Group. It has six blocks completed in 1999.

King Hin Court 

King Hin Court is a Home Ownership Scheme court in Diamond Hill, near Fu Shan Estate. It has only one block completed in 2002. However, the sales of the court was suspended after the government announced the suspension of HOS courts afterwards. During the SARS outbreak in 2003, the court was furnished as temporary quarters for frontline medical staff in order to minimize the chance of infection among them and their families. It was re-sold under the Sales of Surplus HOS Flats Phase 4.

King Lai Court 
King Lai Court is a Home Ownership Scheme court in Diamond Hill, near King Shan Court and Kingsford Terrace. It has two blocks built in 1989.

King Shan Court 
King Shan Court is a Home Ownership Scheme court in Diamond Hill, near Fu Shan Estate. It has six blocks built in 1982 and it is the earliest HOS court built in Diamond Hill.

King Shan Court is in Primary One Admission (POA) School Net 45. Within the school net are multiple aided schools (operated independently but funded with government money); no government primary schools are in this net.

Kingsford Terrace 

Kingsford Terrace is a Home Ownership Scheme and Private Sector Participation Scheme court in Ngau Chi Wan, near King Lai Court, which was jointly developed by Hong Kong Housing Authority and New World Development. It has totally 5 blocks built in 2003. However, its sales was suspended after the Hong Kong SAR Government announced the suspension of selling HOS courts. In 2004, the Government spent HK$1.4 billion to buy back all the flats of the court from New World Development. In 2007, the flats were re-sold to public through the Sales of Surplus HOS Flats Phase 1 and 2.

Kingsford Terrace is in Primary One Admission (POA) School Net 45. Within the school net are multiple aided schools (operated independently but funded with government money); no government primary schools are in this net.

Sun Lai Garden 
Sun Lai Garden is a Home Ownership Scheme and Private Sector Participation Scheme court in Ngau Chi Wan, near King Hin Court and Grand View Garden. It was jointly developed by Hong Kong Housing Authority and Sun Hung Kai Properties. It has 3 blocks, which were completed in 1985.

See also
 List of public housing estates in Hong Kong

References 

Ngau Chi Wan
Wong Tai Sin District